Vernonia fasciculata, the smooth ironweed or common ironweed, or prairie ironweed is a species of perennial plant from family Asteraceae. It is native to Manitoba in Canada and the north-central U.S.A.

Vernonia fasciculata inhabits areas with moist soils and prairies. It flowers in July to September.

Description

Cultivation
V. fasciculata is winter hardy in USDA zones 4-9, it is planted in full sun and used in rain gardens and as a naturalized plant because of its showy flower display, it is deer tolerant and adaptable to wet soils.

References 

fasciculata